The term "Umass band" can refer to two marching bands in the University of Massachusetts system:
University of Massachusetts Minuteman Marching Band
University of Massachusetts Lowell Riverhawk Marching Band